Reunited is a New Zealand television series. Presented by adoption advocate Alex Gilbert, the series follows six Russian-born adoptees on their own personal story of re-connecting with their birth families. It first aired on TVNZ 1 in February, 2022. Gilbert also serves as the narrator for the series and as one of the writers.

Episodes

Reception 
In a review from stuff.co.nz, Reunited was mentioned with Alex Gilbert being adopted himself, he shows compassion with each adopted person during the series. It has also been noted for its cinematography work.

References

External links 
Reunited on TVNZ+ 
Reunited on IMDb

New Zealand documentary television series